Mustahamba may refer to several places in Estonia:
Mustahamba, Võru County, village in Rõuge Parish, Võru County, Estonia
Mustahamba, former name of Kahrila-Mustahamba, village in Rõuge Parish, Võru County, Estonia